Korec may refer to:
 Korets, city in Ukraine
 A trade name for quinapril
 Ján Chryzostom Korec (1924-2015), Roman Catholic cardinal